The 2015 term of the Supreme Court of the United States began October 5, 2015, and concluded October 2, 2016. The table below illustrates which opinion was filed by each justice in each case and which justices joined each opinion.

Table key

2015 term opinions

2015 term membership and statistics
This was the eleventh term of Chief Justice Roberts's tenure. Justice Scalia died on February 13, 2016, making it the sixth and final term with the same membership.

Notes

References

 

Lists of United States Supreme Court opinions by term